I Love to Lie is the debut studio album by Atlanta duo Lowertown, released October 21, 2022, by Dirty Hit. The album was announced August 25 along with the release of lead single "Bucktooth", which also came with a music video directed by Zev Megasis. The album was recorded in London. Second single "Antibiotics" was released September 15, third single No Way released October 6, and the fourth single "My Friends" was released simultaneous with the album.

Background 
Avsha Weinberg described his and his bandmate's recording process for the album as "worse" than that of their previous EP The Gaping Maw. The duo recorded in London with Catherine Marks in the middle of Winter. Olivia Osby had just gone through a bad breakup, both members contracted COVID-19, and the longer recording process meant spending more time away from their newly adopted home in New York City.

In an interview with Our Cultures Konstantinos Pappis, the duo mentioned inspirations for the album which included their bouts with illness, the 1970s and '80s New York punk scene, and the '80s films Down by Law and Paris, Texas.

Style and reception 

Beats Per Minutes Eddie Smith writes that there's "an excellent EP" in the album, "yet the surrounding misjudgments on I Love to Lie result in a record that frustrates and underwhelms." The album swaps the band's previous lo-fi sound for a more slick tone produced by Marks, and both member's lead vocals are "misused". Smith concludes by calling I Love to Lie "not a bad album by any standard, however, the abundance of unfulfilled potential overshadows its better moments". DIYs Sarah Jamieson calls the album a "melding pot of differing styles" which "acts as a potent journey through the band's psyche, hung together by the vulnerable lyricism that Olivia [Osby] has become known for."

Year-end lists

Track listing

Personnel 
 Olivia Osby – lead vocals
 Avsha Weinberg – lead vocals
 Catherine Marks – producer

References 

2022 debut albums
Lowertown albums
Dirty Hit albums
Albums produced by Catherine Marks